Hemimyzon khonensis is a species of hillstream loach in the genus Hemimyzon. It is known from a single specimen collected in the Mekong at the Khone Falls in Laos, near the Cambodian border; it is named for the falls.

References 

 

Hemimyzon
Fish of the Mekong Basin
Fish of Laos
Fish described in 2000